The Sowetan is an English-language South African daily newspaper that started in 1981 as a liberation struggle newspaper and was freely distributed to households in the then apartheid-segregated township of Soweto, Johannesburg, Gauteng Province.

It is one of the largest national newspapers in South Africa. Regarded as having a left-leaning editorial tone, it carries a readership of almost 2 million and a circulation of 124,000 in 2006.

The newspaper is property of South African media company Arena Holdings (formerly Tiso Blackstar Group, Avusa, and Times Media Group). Before that, it belonged to Dr. Nthato Motlana (1925–30 November 2008), a prominent South African businessman, physician and anti-apartheid activist, who took a leading role in the formation of the New African Investments Limited (NAIL), which purchased The Sowetan following apartheid.

History
The Sowetan started in 1981, as replacement of the Post Transvaal newspaper, which itself consisted of editorial staff that migrated from another newspaper, The World. At the time there was a total strike at the Post (for better increases). The strike lasted so long that the Post, which was financially independent from the Argus printing and publishing, nearly went bankrupt, resulting in the property and printing presses being sold to Caxtons. Caxtons then got the contract to print the Post and another building was found in Industria.

Two days before publishing the Post again the government decided to ban the Post. The Post had more newspaper names registered and after some deliberation it was decided to go with The Sowetan. This was a weekly, Saturday and Sunday paper. The latter was later closed as it was never financially viable. The Sowetan never was a free sheet as it was never published before this date. The name was registered at the time with the intention to publish at a rather huge cost. It was one of more titles registered as a backup at the time.

Sales in the beginning were slow because people wrongly assumed that The Sowetan had only news from Soweto. It was in fact a countrywide newspaper from the beginning and was distributed in the Transvaal, Natal, Orange Free State, with copies also going to Port Elizabeth and Cape Town. Due to the poor sales and high costs, the Port Elizabeth and Cape Town distribution was stopped after a few years. It took nearly two years before it was accepted and sales started soaring. Percy Qoboza was the editor at the time but was soon replaced by Joe Latakgomo. Latagomo started as a sports editor in 1967. Later Latakgomo left and joined The Star, after receiving death threats, and was replaced by Aggrey Klaaste, who was editor from 1988 to 2002.

Distribution areas

Distribution figures

Readership figures

See also 
 List of newspapers in South Africa
 The World

References

External links
 The Sowetan Official Website
 SAARF Website

1981 establishments in South Africa
Mass media in Johannesburg
Daily newspapers published in South Africa
English-language newspapers published in Africa
Mass media in Soweto
Publications established in 1981